National Secondary Route 132, or just Route 132 (or ) is a National Road Route of Costa Rica, located in the Puntarenas province.

Description
In Puntarenas province the route covers Puntarenas canton (Chomes district).

References

Highways in Costa Rica